Rouissat is a town and commune in Ouargla District, Ouargla Province, Algeria. According to the 2008 census it has a population of 58,112, up from 37,814 in 1998, and a population growth rate of 4.5%. It is within the urban area of the provincial capital Ouargla, lying just to the south of the city center.

Localities
The commune is composed of eight localities:

Rouissat
El Hadeb
Babanou
Sidi Naïmi
Ziaïna
Sidi mbarek
Sokra
 lachoual

References

Neighbouring towns and cities

Communes of Ouargla Province
Algeria